Thomas Pestock (born September 13, 1984) is an American professional wrestler and former professional football player. He is currently signed to WWE, where he performs on the Raw brand under the ring name Baron Corbin.

Pestock is a former offensive lineman for the Indianapolis Colts and Arizona Cardinals of the National Football League (NFL), as well as a three-time Golden Gloves champion and former grappling champion. Pestock signed with WWE in 2012 and was assigned to their developmental brand NXT as Baron Corbin. He debuted on the main roster at WrestleMania 32, winning the André the Giant Memorial Battle Royal. He went on to win the 2017 Money in the Bank men's ladder match and WWE United States Championship once. In 2018, he was made the Constable of Raw and started a feud with Kurt Angle which culminated at WrestleMania 35, with Corbin defeating him in his retirement match. A few months later, he won the 2019 King of the Ring tournament, thus changing his ring name to King Corbin until June 2021, where he lost his crown and subsequently became destitute. However in August 2021, he adopted the new ring name Happy Corbin and portraying a happy go-lucky wealthy character. He then started a brief alliance with Madcap Moss. In October 2022, he reverted back to the Baron Corbin ring name and was managed by JBL until February 2023.

Early life
Thomas Pestock was born in Lenexa, Kansas, on September 13, 1984. He has trained extensively in boxing and by 2007, he was a two-time Golden Gloves regional amateur boxing champion. He participated in the 2008 Golden Gloves National Tournament of Champions in the super heavyweight division, defeating Chaen Chess in the preliminaries and losing to Andrae Cathron in the quarter-finals.

Football career

College 
Pestock attended NCAA Division II college Northwest Missouri State University, where he played offensive guard, and he became a starter his junior year in 2007. Pestock was named honorable mention all-MIAA in 2007 and first-team all-MIAA in 2008. He was part of teams that went to four consecutive Division II National Championships and lost each time.

Professional 
Pestock signed with the Indianapolis Colts on April 27, 2009, after going undrafted in the 2009 NFL Draft. While with the Colts, he was roommates with future All-Pro punter and professional wrestler Pat McAfee, a fact that was central to a feud between the two of them in WWE 13 years later. He was released by the Colts on August 13 and re-signed by the team on August 19. He was again released by the Colts on September 5.

Pestock joined the Arizona Cardinals' practice squad on December 24, 2009. He was re-signed to a futures contract on January 18, 2010, and was noted for throwing uppercuts in a team scuffle in training camp. He was released by the Cardinals on September 3 and signed to the team's practice squad on September 6. On January 4, 2011, he was again signed to a futures contract with the Cardinals. He was again released on September 2, 2011.

Professional wrestling career

WWE

The Loner  (2012–2016) 

Pestock signed with WWE's developmental system NXT in August 2012. Using the ring name Baron Corbin, he made his in-ring debut on October 18 at a house show, losing to Dante Dash. He would work in several NXT events, usually as an enhancement talent.

On September 11, 2014, at NXT TakeOver: Fatal 4-Way, Corbin re-debuted as a face with a new look and ring character to defeat CJ Parker. Corbin then won numerous singles matches against enhancement talents, each in a short amount of time, until crossing paths with Bull Dempsey, who was also winning his matches quickly, beginning a feud between the two. After a staredown at NXT TakeOver: R Evolution on December 11, Corbin won their highly anticipated one-on-one match on the January 14, 2015, episode of NXT, breaking Dempsey's undefeated streak in the process. Corbin again defeated Dempsey in the first round of a number #1 contender's tournament for the NXT Championship, but was eliminated by Adrian Neville in the semi-finals, ending Corbin's undefeated streak. At NXT TakeOver: Rival on February 11, Corbin defeated Dempsey in a No Disqualification match to end their feud.

In the following weeks, the crowd turned on him and on the May 13 episode of NXT, Corbin turned heel by showing a cocky and banterous persona. He started a feud with Rhyno, whom he defeated at NXT TakeOver: Unstoppable on May 20. Corbin lost to Samoa Joe at NXT TakeOver: Brooklyn on August 22. In September, Corbin formed a tag team with former rival Rhyno to take place in the Dusty Rhodes Tag Team Classic tournament, defeating The Ascension in the first round, and Johnny Gargano and Tommaso Ciampa in the second round. At NXT TakeOver: Respect on October 7, Corbin and Rhyno defeated Chad Gable and Jason Jordan to advance to the finals of the tournament, where they lost to Finn Bálor and Samoa Joe. After the event, a battle royal was held to determine the number #1 contender for the NXT Championship, which saw Corbin being lastly eliminated by Apollo Crews, who Corbin attacked during his title match to cost him the title, thus igniting a feud between the two that culminated in a match at NXT TakeOver: London on December 16, where Corbin defeated Crews.

In January 2016, Corbin was involved in a triple threat match between Sami Zayn and Samoa Joe on the January 27 episode of NXT to determine the number #1 contender for Finn Bálor's NXT Championship, but Corbin lost after Zayn and Joe both applied their submission holds on Corbin at the same time, with Corbin submitting. NXT General Manager William Regal did not give Corbin another title opportunity, leading to Corbin stating Regal would "regret" his decision, which culminated on the March 2 episode of NXT when Corbin attacked Austin Aries from behind after Regal introduced him, beginning a feud between the two that culminated in a match at NXT TakeOver: Dallas on April 1, where Corbin lost to Aries. On the April 13 episode of NXT, Corbin defeated Tucker Knight in his final NXT appearance.

The Lone Wolf  (2016–2018) 
Corbin made his main roster debut at Wrestlemania 32, winning the André the Giant Memorial Battle Royal by last eliminating Kane. The following night on Raw, he assaulted Dolph Ziggler after their match, beginning a feud between the two. Corbin was defeated by Ziggler at the Payback pre-show on May 1 and was eliminated by him from a battle royal on Raw. Corbin defeated Ziggler on the May 9 episode of Raw and in a no disqualification match at the Extreme Rules pre-show on May 22. Ziggler then challenged Corbin to a technical wrestling match, which ended in a disqualification after Ziggler hit Corbin with a low blow. At Money in the Bank on June 19, Corbin defeated Ziggler to end their feud.

At the 2016 WWE draft on July 19, Corbin was drafted to the SmackDown brand. After Apollo Crews earned a match for the Intercontinental Championship by defeating Corbin and Kalisto in a triple threat match, Corbin repeatedly assaulted Kalisto (who had been pinned in the match), eventually putting him out of action with a (kayfabe) injury. He defeated Crews at the Backlash pre-show on September 11. At No Mercy on October 9, he defeated Jack Swagger as well on the October 18 episode of SmackDown. On the November 8 episode of SmackDown, the returning Kalisto attacked Corbin, causing a (kayfabe) injury and forcing Corbin to drop out of SmackDown's Survivor Series team. After retaliating by costing Kalisto the Cruiserweight Championship at Survivor Series, Kalisto attacked Corbin with a chair during a match on the November 22 episode of SmackDown, leading to a 
chairs match between the two at TLC: Tables, Ladders & Chairs on December 4, which Corbin won.

On the December 20 episode of SmackDown, Corbin confronted Dolph Ziggler, who had just earned a title match against WWE Champion AJ Styles. A match between the two, with Ziggler's title opportunity on the line, ended in a double countout; as a result, Corbin was added to the title match, giving Corbin his first world title opportunity in WWE. On December 27, Styles won the match by pinning Ziggler. At the Royal Rumble on January 29, Corbin entered the Royal Rumble match at #13, eliminating Braun Strowman and lasting over 32 minutes before being eliminated by The Undertaker. At Elimination Chamber on February 12, Corbin competed in the namesake match for the WWE Championship. Immediately after being eliminated by Intercontinental Champion Dean Ambrose, Corbin attacked Ambrose, causing the latter's elimination. Corbin attacked Ambrose on the March 7 episode of SmackDown with metal pipe and a forklift. On March 21, Ambrose retaliated by distracting Corbin in a match against Randy Orton. Corbin unsuccessfully challenged Ambrose for the Intercontinental Championship at the WrestleMania 33 pre-show on April 2 but defeated Ambrose in a non-title Street Fight on SmackDown. On the April 17 episode of SmackDown, Corbin failed to win a title opportunity for the United States Championship in a triple threat match against AJ Styles and Sami Zayn. After the show, Corbin attacked Zayn and also shoved an official, for which he was suspended and fined by SmackDown Commissioner Shane McMahon. At Backlash on May 21, Corbin lost to Zayn.

At Money in the Bank on June 18, Corbin won the namesake match, earning him a world title match at the time of his choosing. Corbin lost to Shinsuke Nakamura by disqualification at Battleground on July 23 and again on the following episode of SmackDown.  On the August 1 episode of SmackDown, Corbin attacked Nakamura, who had just become number #1 contender for the WWE Championship, but was attacked by Cena. On the August 15 episode of SmackDown, Corbin interrupted a match between John Cena and WWE Champion Jinder Mahal and cashed in his Money in the Bank contract, but was pinned by Mahal after being sidetracked by Cena, becoming the third wrestler to fail to win the title in a cash-in. At SummerSlam on August 20, Corbin lost to Cena.

On the August 22 episode of SmackDown, Corbin was approached by Kevin Owens to officiate his title match against United States Champion AJ Styles, with the promise of a future championship match if Owens were to win the title; Corbin abandoned the match towards the end after heavy criticism from Shane McMahon, leaving the officiating duty to Shane instead. The following week, both Corbin and Tye Dillinger wanted to answer an open challenge issued by Styles; Dillinger was quicker but was then attacked by Corbin. Corbin defeated Dillinger the following week and on September 19, challenged Styles to a match at Hell in a Cell. When Corbin lost to Dillinger the following week on SmackDown, Dillinger was added to the match. In the subsequent triple threat match at Hell in a Cell on October 8, Corbin pinned Dillinger to win the title. Corbin retained the title against Styles on SmackDown and defeated Intercontinental Champion The Miz in an Interbrand Champion vs Champion match at Survivor Series on November 19. At Clash of Champions on December 17, Corbin lost his title to Dolph Ziggler in a triple threat match also involving Bobby Roode, ending his reign at 70 days.

At Royal Rumble on January 28, 2018, Corbin entered at #4 but was eliminated by Finn Bálor. On the February 13 episode of SmackDown, Corbin defeated Kevin Owens to earn a spot in the six-pack challenge for the WWE Championship. At Fastlane on March 11, Styles won the six-pack challenge by pinning Owens. Corbin competed in the Andre the Giant Memorial Battle Royal on the WrestleMania 34 pre-show on April 8; he made it to the final two before being eliminated by Matt Hardy.

Constable Corbin (2018–2019) 

On April 16, Corbin moved to the Raw brand as part of the Superstar Shake-up. On the June 4 episode of Raw, he became commissioner Stephanie McMahon's representative as the Constable of Raw, a storyline position without real power in the promotion. The following week, Corbin debuted a new look, wearing a suit and a shaved head. Corbin then started a feud with Finn Bálor, to whom he lost at Extreme Rules on July 15 and at SummerSlam on August 19. On the following episode of Raw, he was pointed as acting general manager, replacing Kurt Angle. On the September 17 episode of Raw, Corbin booked himself against Roman Reigns for the Universal Championship, but did not win the title.

On November 2 at Crown Jewel, Corbin cost Braun Strowman the Universal Championship in a match against Brock Lesnar, starting a feud between the two. At TLC: Tables, Ladders & Chairs on December 16, Corbin faced Strowman in a TLC match where, if Corbin won, he would become a full-time general manager of Raw; but if Corbin lost, he would be stripped of his authoritative powers. Strowman enlisted the help of Apollo Crews, Bobby Roode, Chad Gable, Finn Bálor, and former Raw general manager Kurt Angle to defeat Corbin. The next night on Raw, authority figures Vince McMahon, Shane McMahon, Stephanie McMahon, and Triple H stated that they would now be running both Raw and SmackDown as a unit with no general managers. Corbin confronted the McMahons to have another chance to become the Raw General Manager. Triple H said that if he could defeat Kurt Angle, he could become the Raw General Manager. However, Triple H added Apollo Crews, Bobby Roode, and Chad Gable to make it a 4-on-1 handicap match that Corbin lost, definitively ruling him out of the position. Corbin continued his feud with Braun Strowman, being eliminated by him in the Royal Rumble match at the Royal Rumble on January 27, 2019. At Elimination Chamber on February 17, Corbin defeated Strowman in a no disqualification match, following interference from Bobby Lashley and Drew McIntyre. The next night on Raw, Corbin was defeated by Strowman in a tables match, ending their feud.

Corbin started a feud with Kurt Angle on the March 18 episode of Raw. Angle selected Corbin as his opponent for WrestleMania 35 in his farewell match, as Corbin had caused Angle many problems during Angle's tenure as Raw general manager. At WrestleMania on April 7, Corbin defeated Angle. On the May 27 episode of Raw, Corbin defeated Braun Strowman, Bobby Lashley, and The Miz in a fatal four-way elimination match to earn a Universal Championship match against the champion Seth Rollins. At Super ShowDown on June 7, Corbin lost to Rollins, but during the match, Corbin got into an argument with referee John Cone, allowing Rollins to roll-up Corbin to retain the title. This led to a rematch at Stomping Grounds, where Corbin chose Lacey Evans, who was in an ongoing feud with Rollins' real life girlfriend Becky Lynch, as the special guest referee for the match; Evans was biased towards Corbin throughout the match, adding multiple stipulations in his favour. However, Lynch, who defeated Evans for the Raw Women's Championship earlier in the night, attacked Evans and took her out of the match, leading to Rollins' victory over Corbin at the event on June 23. The following night on Raw, Corbin and Evans challenged Rollins and Lynch to a match at Extreme Rules. The match was agreed to with two stipulations: Rollins and Lynch would defend their respective championships, while the match would be the final respective championship opportunities for Corbin and Evans. At Extreme Rules on July 14, Corbin and Evans lost the match.

King Corbin (2019–2021) 
In August, Corbin was announced as one of sixteen competitors in the 2019 King of the Ring tournament. After over a month away from Raw, Corbin returned on the August 19 episode, where he and McIntyre lost to Ricochet and The Miz. In the following weeks, Corbin defeated The Miz in the first round, Cedric Alexander in the quarterfinals, Ricochet and Samoa Joe in the semifinals, and Chad Gable in the finals to win the tournament, subsequently changing his ring name to King Corbin. At Hell in a Cell on October 6, Corbin dubbed Gable as "Shorty G" before he lost with a roll-up pin.

As part of the 2019 draft, Corbin was drafted to the SmackDown brand. At Crown Jewel on October 31, Corbin was a member of Team Flair, where they lost to Team Hogan. In November, Corbin began a feud with Roman Reigns defeating him on the November 8 episode of SmackDown following interference from Dolph Ziggler and Robert Roode. At Survivor Series on November 24, Corbin was a member of Team SmackDown and caused his Team SmackDown partner Mustafa Ali to be eliminated, which then led to team captain Roman Reigns performing a spear on Corbin that caused him to be eliminated, while Reigns went on to win the match for his team. Corbin defeated Reigns in a TLC match at TLC: Tables, Ladders & Chairs on December 15 following interference from Dolph Ziggler and The Revival (Dash Wilder and Scott Dawson). At Royal Rumble on January 26, 2020, Corbin lost to Reigns in a falls count anywhere match after interference from The Usos also involving Dolph Ziggler and Robert Roode also later that same night he entered the Royal Rumble match at number 22 eliminating Matt Riddle before being eliminated by the eventual winner Drew McIntyre, and a steel cage match at Super ShowDown on February 27, ending their feud.

On the first night of WrestleMania 36 on April 4, Corbin lost to Elias.
On the April 24 episode of SmackDown, Corbin defeated Drew Gulak with the help of Cesaro and Shinsuke Nakamura to qualify for the Money in the Bank ladder match. At Money in the Bank on May 10, Corbin failed to win the contract after he and AJ Styles tussled over the briefcase and dropped it to Otis unintentionally. On the July 17 episode of SmackDown, he attacked Matt Riddle, leading to a match at Payback on August 30, where Corbin lost to Riddle. He defeated Riddle on the September 25 episode of SmackDown, ending their feud. From December 2020 to February 2021, Corbin began a feud with Rey Mysterio, Dominik Mysterio, and Murphy, which saw him form a short-lived partnership with Wesley Blake and Steve Cutler, but disbanded following Cutler and Blake's WWE release.

On the June 18 episode of SmackDown, Corbin lost to Shinsuke Nakamura in a Battle for the Crown match, thus losing his crown to Nakamura and ending his King gimmick. The following week on SmackDown, his ring name was reverted to Baron Corbin.

Sad Corbin (2021) 
On the July 16 episode of SmackDown, Corbin began sporting dirty clothes, an unkempt beard and an unshaved head, giving him a disheveled look. He revealed that, after losing his crown, he had lost his car, his investments, his savings, his home was to be foreclosed upon, and his wife left with their daughters. Corbin then revealed his own version of a GoFundMe campaign, called CorbinFund.com, asking fans and fellow wrestlers to donate to the cause. On the July 30 episode of SmackDown, Corbin emerged at the contract signing between Universal Champion Roman Reigns and Finn Bálor for a championship match at SummerSlam, attacking Bálor and attempting to sign the contract. However, John Cena also emerged to the ring and took out Corbin before Cena signed the contract himself. On the August 13 episode of SmackDown, Corbin stole the Money in the Bank briefcase from Big E before fleeing the arena. At the SummerSlam pre-show on August 21, Corbin lost to Big E, who regained the briefcase.

Happy Corbin (2021-2022) 
On the August 27 episode of SmackDown, after turning his misfortunes around in Las Vegas, he drove into the arena in a Bentley, declaring himself "filthy rich" and demanding to be called "Happy Corbin". On the September 24 episode of SmackDown, Corbin gained a new ally in Madcap Moss. They entered into a feud with Drew McIntyre, with Corbin accompanying Moss to his matches with McIntyre at Day 1 on January 1, 2022 and Elimination Chamber on February 19, both of which he lost. Corbin (and Moss) participated in the Royal Rumble match at the namesake event on January 29, entering at #15 and eliminating Rick Boogs and Ricochet, but was eliminated by McIntyre. On the first night of WrestleMania 38 on April 2, he faced McIntyre in a losing effort.

On the April 8 episode of SmackDown, Corbin blamed his loss on Moss before attacking him, ending their alliance and beginning a feud between the two. This led to a match at WrestleMania Backlash on May 8, which Moss won. At Hell in a Cell on June 5, the two competed in a No Holds Barred match, which Corbin lost. On the June 17 episode of SmackDown, Corbin lost to Moss in a Last Laugh match, ending their feud; after the match, Corbin confronted commentator Pat McAfee, who had been making fun of Corbin during his feud with Moss. On the July 1 episode of SmackDown, Corbin competed in a Money in the Bank qualifying fatal four-way match, which was won by Moss. After Money in the Bank went off the air the following day, Corbin attacked McAfee at ringside and accepted his challenge for a match at SummerSlam. At the event on July 30, Corbin lost to McAfee after he hit a low-blow while the referee was down. On the August 19 episode of SmackDown, he competed in a fatal five way match to determine the #1 contender for the Intercontinental Championship, which was won by Sheamus.

Modern Day Wrestling God (2022-2023) 
On the October 17, 2022 episode of Raw, Corbin returned under his Baron Corbin ring name alongside Hall of Famer JBL and defeated Dolph Ziggler. Debuting the new moniker of "The Modern Day Wrestling God”, he would then go on for a winning streak until losing to Drew McIntyre on the November 21, 2022 episode of Raw. At the Royal Rumble on January 28, 2023, Corbin entered the Royal Rumble match at #14 but was eliminated by Seth "Freakin" Rollins in 7 seconds after being attacked by Brock Lesnar. After a loss to Dexter Lumis on the February 6th episode of Raw, JBL ended his association with Corbin.

Personal life 
Pestock married Rochelle Roman in 2017. They reside in Tampa, Florida, and have two daughters.

As a tribute to his father, who died in 2008 from Creutzfeldt–Jakob disease, Pestock wears his father's wedding ring on a necklace. He is known for his numerous tattoos which include portraits of his father and grandfather on his leg, full sleeve tattoos on his left arm that include clocks representing family members' birthdays, as well as tattoos memorializing his friends Ryan Dunn and Zachary Hartwell, members of the Jackass crew who died in a car crash in June 2011.

Pestock has credited Bill DeMott, Corey Graves, Billy Gunn, Kane, and Dusty Rhodes with helping him develop his wrestling gimmick. He is close friends with fellow wrestlers Matthew Clement and Shawn Spears. After shaving his head in June 2018, he donated his ponytail to charity.

Pestock is good friends with heavy metal singer Tommy Vext, who sang Pestock's theme song "I Bring the Darkness" from 2017 until 2021.

Pestock is a Kansas City Chiefs fan. He is good friends with Pat McAfee, having been teammates at the Indianapolis Colts and lived together during their rookie year. They bonded over their love for wrestling.

Championships and accomplishments 

 Pro Wrestling Illustrated
Most Hated Wrestler of the Year (2019)
 Ranked No. 39 of the top 500 singles wrestlers in the PWI 500 in 2019
Revolver
  Most Metal Athlete (2016)
 Wrestling Observer Newsletter
 Most Overrated (2018, 2019)
 Worst Gimmick (2018) 
 WWE
WWE United States Championship (1 time)
 André the Giant Memorial Trophy (2016)
 King of the Ring (2019)
Money in the Bank (Men's 2017)
WWE Year-End Award for Most Hated of the Year (2018)

References

External links 

 
 
 

1984 births
21st-century professional wrestlers
American football offensive guards
American male boxers
American male professional wrestlers
Arizona Cardinals players
Indianapolis Colts players
Living people
Northwest Missouri State Bearcats football players
NWA/WCW/WWE United States Heavyweight Champions
People from Lenexa, Kansas
Players of American football from Kansas
Professional wrestlers from Kansas
Professional wrestling authority figures
Super-heavyweight boxers
WWF/WWE King Crown's Champions/King of the Ring winners